Goyet may refer to:

People
Goyet is a French surname. Notable people with the surname include:
Eugène Goyet (1798—1857), French painter, son of Jean-Baptiste Goyet, husband of Zoé Goyet
Jean-Baptiste Goyet (1779—1854), French painter, father of Eugène Goyet
Zoé Goyet (died 8 July 1869), French painter, wife of Eugène Goyet

Places
Goyet (place), a hamlet in France
Goyet Caves, located near Goyet, France